The defending champion was Magnus Gustafsson, but he lost in the second round to Martín Rodríguez. The unseeded Juan Antonio Marín from Costa Rica won the singles title.

Seeds
A champion seed is indicated in bold text while text in italics indicates the round in which that seed was eliminated.

Draw

References

Men's Singles
Singles